Akhtar Naraghi is a Canadian poet, writer and scholar. She founded the International Organization of the Helen Prize for Women.

Biography
She holds a doctorate in English literature from McGill University and works in English. Her novels are all written in the first person, and revolve around the narrator's efforts to make a home in new surroundings, in different cultures. She has published four novels, in the first three of which – The Big Green House (1994; short-listed for the QSPELL Hugh McLennan Prize for Fiction in 1995), Blue Curtains (1999) and With Mara That Summer (2004) – the narrator-protagonist recounts episodes from her life, beginning in early childhood and ending with her declining years. Her latest novel, On the Train to My Village (2011), is a story of love and the artist's existence partly inspired by the author's time spent in the Gaspé region of Quebec. Her work has been translated into French, Persian and German.

Naraghi is also the author of three collections of verse, Legacy (1992), Solitude (1996) and Autumn Bird (2011), in addition to having contributed forewords, articles and short stories to numerous journals.

In 1987, she founded the International Organization of the Helen Prize for Women, named for Dr. Helen Caldicott, the creator of Physicians for Social Responsibility. The Helen Prize annually honors the achievements of women of the world, whatever their backgrounds or fields of endeavor.

References 

Living people
20th-century Canadian novelists
20th-century Canadian poets
21st-century Canadian novelists
21st-century Canadian poets
Canadian women poets
Year of birth missing (living people)
Canadian Muslims
Canadian women novelists
20th-century Canadian women writers
21st-century Canadian women writers